"Words" is a song by Pat Boone that reached number 94 on the Bllboard Hot 100 in 1960.

Background 
It is a new-lyrics version of the song "Silver Threads Among the Gold".

Track listing

Charts

References 

1960 songs
1960 singles
Pat Boone songs
Dot Records singles